Benjamin Pond (1768October 6, 1814) was a United States representative from New York.

Early life
He was born in Stockbridge in the Province of Massachusetts Bay in 1768. He attended the common schools, became a farmer, and moved to Poultney, Vermont in 1800. He later moved to a portion of Crown Point which was included in the town of Schroon at Schroon's founding, and was subsequently incorporated into the town of North Hudson, New York.

Political career
His political career began in 1804 when he became a justice of the peace and Schroon's town supervisor. In 1808 he was appointed judge of the Essex County court of common pleas, and he served until his death. Pond served in the New York State Assembly from 1808 to 1810.

In 1810 Pond was elected as a Democratic-Republican to the Twelfth Congress (March 4, 1811 – March 3, 1813).

During the War of 1812 he served in the New York Militia as a matross in Captain Russell Walker’s company of the 6th Artillery Regiment. He participated in the defense of northern New York and took part in the September, 1814 Battle of Plattsburgh.

Death
In 1814 Pond was elected to the Fourteenth Congress, the term of which was scheduled to begin on March 4, 1815. He died in Schroon on October 6, 1814 of disease incurred through exposure at the Battle of Plattsburgh, and so never took his seat in the Fourteenth Congress.

Pond was buried in North Hudson's Pine Ridge Cemetery. On September 3, 1923 he was re-interred in Elizabethtown, New York's Riverside Cemetery.

Resources

 (Riverside Cemetery, Elizabethtown, New York)
Benjamin Pond at Find A Grave (Pine Ridge Cemetery, North Hudson, New York)

1768 births
1814 deaths
People from Stockbridge, Massachusetts
People from Poultney (town), Vermont
People from Essex County, New York
Town supervisors in New York (state)
Members of the New York State Assembly
New York (state) state court judges
American military personnel killed in the War of 1812
Democratic-Republican Party members of the United States House of Representatives from New York (state)
Burials in New York (state)